Joseph "Joe" Talamo (born January 12, 1990 in Marrero, Louisiana) is a Champion jockey in American Thoroughbred horse racing.

Born and raised in Marrero on the West Bank of the Mississippi River, within the Greater New Orleans Metropolitan area, Joe Talamo was influenced by a father who worked in horse racing as an assistant trainer. At age eleven, he began riding horses and worked as a stable boy. Like many successful Cajun jockeys before him, Talamo first raced at a bush track. His skills and desire was such that he decided to leave high school in order to pursue a professional riding career. He debuted at Louisiana Downs in June 2006 and went on to become the first apprentice jockey to win a riding title at the Fair Grounds Race Course in New Orleans.

In April 2007, during his breakout year fresh off his riding title at the Fair Grounds, Talamo moved to live in Playa del Rey, California from where he competes primarily at race tracks in the southern part of the state. He was the second leading jockey in wins during the Hollywood Park Racetrack 2007 Spring/Summer meet. For 2007, he notably earned five Grade I Graded stakes race wins and was voted the Eclipse Award as the 2007 United States Champion Apprentice Jockey.

Joe Talamo has been the regular jockey on I Want Revenge who was the favorite to win the 2009 Kentucky Derby but the horse was scratched on the day of the race. He had said that if he wins the Derby, he is going to donate twenty-five percent of what he earns to the Children's Hospital of New Orleans that cares for all children, regardless of a family's ability to pay. 

Talamo was one of the jockeys featured Animal Planet's 2009 reality documentary, Jockeys.

He was invited by the Hong Kong Jockey Club to participate in the Cathay Pacific International Jockey Championship in December 2009.

He jockeyed atop Sidney's Candy in the 2010 Kentucky Derby. The horse finished in 17th place and out of the money.

He jockeyed atop Attachment Rate in the 2020 Kentucky Derby.

Year-end charts in the United States

References

 Joe Talamo at the NTRA
 NTRA article and video on Joe Talamo's winning a 2007 Eclipse Award
 Animal Planet Page on Jockeys
  Talamo Hits 2,000-Win Milestone Aboard ... - Horse Racing News

1990 births
Living people
American jockeys
Cajun jockeys
Eclipse Award winners
People from Terrytown, Louisiana
People from Marrero, Louisiana